The Toce is a river in Piedmont, Italy, which stretches the length of the Val d'Ossola from the Swiss border to Lake Maggiore into which it debouches near Fondotoce in the commune of Verbania.

Geography 

The source of one of these, the Gries, is situated on the Italian southern side of the Gries Pass; another forms beneath the Passo di San Giacomo, others flow from little Alpine lakes such as Lago Castel and Lago di Sabbione.

South of La Frua the water of the river plummets  over the Cascata del Toce into the Formazza Valley, through which it flows before transversing Valle Antigorio after another series of cascades. Near Crevola d'Ossola the river Diveria flows into the Toce. At this point, the valley gets wider and is known as Val d'Ossola. The Toce flows next to the capital of the valley, Domodossola, and then Villadossola and Ornavasso. After a total of  the Toce then flows into Lake Maggiore.
The major tributaries are the Diveria, Bogna, Melezzo Occidentale (joining it near Domodossola), Ovesca, Anza (near Piedimulera), and the Strona (near Gravellona Toce).

History 
In ancient times the Toce river was called Athisone or Atisone, from which the current name is derived. An old alternative spelling is also La Toccia (with feminine gender).

Notes

 
Rivers of the Alps